Gajavidala is a motif in the architecture of India that depicts a lion overpowering an elephant.

It is a popular theme in Bengal and Odisha.

The Yali is a creature in an Indian legend, with the body of a lion and the trunk and tusks of an elephant.

See also
Hindu iconography
Garuda

References

Odia culture
Hindu iconography
Elephants in Indian culture